The 2020–21 Coastal Carolina Chanticleers women's basketball team represented Coastal Carolina University during the 2020–21 NCAA Division I women's basketball season. The basketball team, led by seventh-year head coach Jaida Williams, played all home games at the HTC Center along with the Coastal Carolina Chanticleers men's basketball team. They were members of the Sun Belt Conference.

Previous season 
The Chanticleers finished the 2019–20 season 25–4, 15–3 in Sun Belt play to finish second in the conference. They made it to the 2019-20 Sun Belt Conference women's basketball tournament where they received a first round bye and were scheduled to play South Alabama in the Quarterfinals. However, before the game could commence, the remainder of the tournament as well as all postseason play was cancelled due to the COVID-19 pandemic.

Offseason

Departures

Transfers

Recruiting

Roster

Schedule and results

|-
!colspan=9 style=| Non-conference Regular Season
|-

|-
!colspan=9 style=| Conference Regular Season
|-

|-
!colspan=9 style=| Sun Belt Tournament

See also
 2020–21 Coastal Carolina Chanticleers men's basketball team

References

Coastal Carolina Chanticleers women's basketball seasons
Coastal Carolina Chanticleers
Coastal Carolina Chanticleers women's basketball
Coastal Carolina Chanticleers women's basketball